Samuel Arowolo Gilmore (born 20 July 1996) is a Nigerian footballer, who plays as a midfielder for the Albanian Superliga champions FK Kukësi.

Club career 
Gilmore began his career with Success F.C. of Lagos in Nigeria. In 2013, he signed with Magic F.C.

In summer 2015 he joined the Israeli club Hapoel Acre on a one-season loan deal. He played his first game in the Israeli Premier League on 31 August 2015 against Bnei Yehuda Tel Aviv He scored his first goal in the Israeli Premier League on 26 September 2015 against Hapoel Be'er Sheva.

On 30 of August 2017 he signed permanent contract with Albanian Superliga champions FK Kukësi.

References

External links 
 
 

1996 births
Living people
Nigerian footballers
Hapoel Acre F.C. players
Hapoel Petah Tikva F.C. players
FK Kukësi players
Israeli Premier League players
Liga Leumit players
Nigerian expatriate footballers
Expatriate footballers in Israel
Expatriate footballers in Albania
Nigerian expatriate sportspeople in Israel
Nigerian expatriate sportspeople in Albania
Association football midfielders